American lager or North American lager is pale lager that is produced in the United States. The pale lager-style beer originated in Europe in the mid-19th century, and moved to the US with German immigrants. As a general trend outside of Bavaria and the Czech Republic where the beers may be firmly hopped, pale lager developed as a modestly hopped beer, and sometimes used adjuncts such as rice or corn – and this was also true in the US.

Worldwide, the best-known American lager is Anheuser-Busch InBev's Budweiser, though prominent brands are also made by MillerCoors (Coors Light, Miller Genuine Draft, etc.) Pale lager is the predominant choice among the largest brewing companies of United States of America, although it is not common in U.S. microbreweries. Likewise, in Canada the biggest-selling commercial beers, including both domestics such as Molson Canadian, Labatt Blue, Kokanee, Carling Black Label, and Old Style Pilsner, and imports such as Budweiser and Coors are very lightly hopped pale lagers. This is by far the largest-selling style in Canada. Just as in the United States, Canadian microbrewers typically do not produce North American-style pale lagers.

Other terms for this type of beer, or sub-categories within it, include "adjunct lager", "American-style light lager", "American-style low-carbohydrate light lager", "American-style lager", "American-style premium lager" (a term used at the World Beer Cup), "North American style-lager" and "North American-style premium lager" (terms used at the Canadian Beer Awards).

History

Both Canada and the United States were traditionally ale (and whisky) consuming regions in the British traditions before the late 19th century.  Pale lager was later introduced to both Canada and the United States by German immigrants. These German brewers developed their beers from the American six-row barley which has a higher tannic acid and protein content and greater husk per weight than continental European barleys (two-row barley). In addition, the Tettnanger and Saaz hops of Europe were not available. Therefore, to balance taste, and dilute the excessive protein, the grain mixture was adjusted by adding up to 30% corn to the barley malt mash. However, the beer was brewed to full-fledged European strength and to the practices of a pale lager style.  Later, rice gained popularity in the domestic brewing market during World War II, due to grain rationing on the home-front. Most breweries were unable to afford the necessary amounts of barley required for production and so began using rice as a filler. After the war, the process was not changed.

Canada had its own, shorter experiment with prohibition which bankrupted many breweries (and distilleries), and with the rise of mass media marketing and national-scale supply chains, the major breweries consolidated into a near triopoly  dominated by Molson, Labatt, and Carling-O'Keefe following the Second World War.  These corporate brewers reacted to a new taste for sweet drinks in a public that had switched to sugary soft drinks and "near-beer" during prohibition.

Currently, the only large-scale representatives of the pre-Prohibition lager style in the United States are D.G. Yuengling & Son with its traditional lager; Genesee Brewing Company with its Genesee beer; and August Schell Brewing Company with its Original. In recent years a number of smaller American breweries have also reintroduced it, such as Victory Brewing Company with its Headwaters Pale Ale, North Coast Brewing Company with Scrimshaw Pilsner, and Full Sail Brewing Company with its Session Lager.

See also
Beer in Canada
Beer in the United States

References

Fix, G. 1994. Pre-prohibition lagers. Brewing Techniques. May/June
Jankowski, B. 1994. Bushwick pilsners. Brewing Techniques. Jan/Feb

External links
Reviving the Classic American Pilsner
Hop Heaven – Philadelphia Citypaper article about Victory Brewing developing a pre-Prohibition style lager (archived 29 April 2005)
a recipe of a pre-Prohibition-style American lager using corn as an adjunct (archived 3 February 2007)

American beer styles

th:ไอซ์เบียร์